Torisashi is a Japanese dish of raw chicken breast sliced very thin. If the chicken is lightly seared it is known as toriwasa. It is most commonly eaten with sumiso but may also be eaten with soy sauce and wasabi like other sashimi.

See also
 List of chicken dishes
 Sashimi

References

Japanese chicken dishes